William Alston Rives House is a historic home located near Goldston, Chatham County, North Carolina.  It dates to the period 1825–1840, and is a two-story, three bay Georgian / Federal style frame dwelling. Also on the property are the contributing a small covered well, a board and batten shed, a tobacco barn, a larger barn, and the Rives family cemetery.

It was listed on the National Register of Historic Places in 1985.

References

Houses on the National Register of Historic Places in North Carolina
Georgian architecture in North Carolina
Federal architecture in North Carolina
Houses completed in 1840
Houses in Chatham County, North Carolina
National Register of Historic Places in Chatham County, North Carolina